Portlandia is an American satire television series created by Fred Armisen, Carrie Brownstein and Jonathan Krisel. The series stars Armisen and Brownstein. It premiered on January 21, 2011, on IFC.

Series overview

Episodes

Season 1 (2011)

Season 2 (2012)

Season 3 (2012–13)

Season 4 (2014)

Season 5 (2015)

Season 6 (2016)

Season 7 (2017)

Season 8 (2018)

Specials

References

External links

Portlandia at IFC.com
Ultimate Character and Episode Guide
 

Lists of American comedy television series episodes
Portlandia (TV series)